Thomas Croombs (13 December 1906 – 15 October 1980) was a Speedway rider who finished third in the Star Riders' Championship in 1931,  the forerunner to the Speedway World Championship. He was born in New Malden, Surrey, England.

He rode for Lea Bridge in 1929 and moved onto the West Ham Hammers in 1930. He stayed with the Hammers until the end of the 1939 season when he retired. In 1947 he made a comeback, riding for West Ham, starting as reserve and then back as a full team member within six weeks.

When West Ham's track, West Ham Stadium was demolished, a road on the new development was named after Croombs.

World final appearances
 1937 –  London, Wembley Stadium – 16th – 8pts
 1938 –  London, Wembley Stadium – 14th – 8pts

Players cigarette cards
Croombs is listed as number 10 of 50 in the 1930s Player's cigarette card collection.

References

1906 births
British speedway riders
English motorcycle racers
West Ham Hammers riders
1980 deaths